The Royal Scottish Society of Arts is a learned society in Scotland, dedicated to the study of science and technology. It was founded as The Society for the Encouragement of the Useful Arts in Scotland by Sir David Brewster in 1821 and dedicated to "the promotion of invention and enterprise". The Society was granted a Royal Charter in 1841.

Background 
For many years the promotion of invention and improvements of all sorts was the main business of the Society, and its meetings were the focus of a large and active cross-section of Edinburgh society - academics, gentry, professionals such as civil engineers and lawyers, and skilled craftsmen such as instrument makers, engravers and printers. The Society's published Transactions provide a record of changes in technology, and the Society's archive is held by the National Library of Scotland, and is a valuable resource to researchers.

In more recent times, the Society's meeting programme has been based on lectures given by expert and often distinguished speakers. The lectures cover a wide range of scientific and technical topics, and still with the original aim of keeping the membership informed about current concerns in science, engineering, medicine, and often with a topical edge.

Meetings of the Society are held in Edinburgh monthly, at 7pm on Monday evenings, from October or November to May or June. In addition, organised visits are made each year to a research, manufacturing or industrial establishment.

Presidents of the Society
Presidents of the society have been:

Awards
The society awards the Makdougall Brisbane medal, founded by Sir Thomas Makdougall Brisbane. This award is not to be confused with the similarly named award given by the Royal Society of Edinburgh.

Recipients have included:
 1865: Arthur Beverly, for his planimeter 
 David Stevenson (1815–1886), civil engineer
 c.1890: William Galt Black, for his wind gauge
 1892: James Blyth, for his wind turbine 
 1910: David Thomas Gwynne-Vaughan
 c.1923: Dawson Turner (1857–1928), pioneer radiologist and D.M.R. Crombie for their paper on An Investigation of the Ionised Atmosphere around Flames by means of an Electrified Pith Ball
 William Dyce Cay (1838-1925) 
 2016: Dr Alison Morrison-Low

Arms

External links
Royal Scottish Society of Arts

References

1821 establishments in Scotland
Scientific societies based in the United Kingdom
Learned societies of Scotland
Science and technology in Scotland
Society of Arts
Charities based in Edinburgh
Organizations established in 1821
1841 in Scotland